FWD Tower, also known as PCPD (Pacific Century Place Jakarta) is a skyscraper at Sudirman Central Business District in South Jakarta, Indonesia. Named after anchor tenant FWD Group, the tower has 40 floors above the ground and 6 floors as basement. It is 211 meters high. The basement of the building is used as podium and for car parking. The podium has retail space, bank and club. There will be a restaurant at the top of the building. The skyscraper is topped of in early 2017. The tower is the new home for head office of Citibank Indonesia.

See also
 List of tallest buildings in Jakarta
 List of tallest buildings in Indonesia
SCBD

References

Buildings and structures in Jakarta
Skyscrapers in Indonesia
Post-independence architecture of Indonesia
Skyscraper office buildings in Indonesia